Louis Annin Ames (1866-1952) was an American flagmaker. From 1896 to 1952 he served as chief executive officer of Annin & Co. In 1915 he designed the flag of the City of New York. He was a member of the Ames family.

Biography
Louis Annin Ames was born on Saint Helena Island, South Carolina on September 5, 1866.

He married Abby Whitney Crowell on January 20, 1909, and they had two children.

He died at his home in Essex Fells, New Jersey on November 28, 1952. He was buried at Kensico Cemetery in Valhalla, New York.

References

1866 births
1952 deaths
Burials at Kensico Cemetery
Flag designers